The Percival Pembroke is a British high-wing twin-engined light transport aircraft built by the Percival Aircraft Company, later Hunting Percival.

Development 
The Pembroke was a development of the Percival Prince civil transport.  It had a longer wing to permit a higher fully laden weight.  The prototype flew on 21 November 1952.  Production was complete in early 1958.

Operational history

It entered service with the Royal Air Force as the Percival Pembroke C.1 in 1953 to replace the Avro Anson for light transport duties.  As with other RAF transports, the passenger seats are rearward-facing for improved safety.

Six were produced as the Pembroke C(PR).1 photographic reconnaissance aircraft. These saw use by No. 81 Squadron RAF during the Malayan Emergency. The RAF's Pembrokes were modified to extend their lifespan in 1970.  The last unit to use them was No. 60 Squadron RAF based at RAF Wildenrath in Germany, these were withdrawn from use in 1988 and were replaced by the Hawker Siddeley Andover.

The Finnish Air Force operated two aircraft for aerial photography between 1956 and 1968, on behalf of the National Land Survey of Finland. One of the aircraft was destroyed when it hit a snow wall during landing in 1965. The other aircraft is currently stored at the Aviation Museum of Central Finland.

Variants 
P.66 Pembroke C.1
Communications and transport variant for the RAF, 44 built.
P.66 Pembroke C(PR).1
Photographic reconnaissance variant for the RAF, six built and two conversions from C.1.
P.66 Pembroke C.51
Export variant for Belgium.
P.66 Pembroke C.52
Export variant for Sweden. Swedish military designation Tp 83.
P.66 Pembroke C.53
Export variant for Finland.
P.66 Pembroke C.54
Export variant for West Germany.
P.66 Pembroke C.55
Export variant for Sudan.
P.66 President
Civil transport version, five built.

Operators 

 
Belgian Air Force operated 12 C.51s from 1954 to 1976.
 
 Royal Danish Air Force
 
 Finnish Air Force
 
 Luftwaffe
 German Army
 German Navy
 
 Military of Malawi
 
 South Rhodesian Air Force operated two C.1 aircraft diverted from Royal Air Force contract.
 
 Swedish Air Force
 
 Sudanese Air Force
 
 Royal Air Force operated 56 aircraft delivered from 1953.
 No. 21 Squadron RAF
 No. 32 Squadron RAF
 No. 60 Squadron RAF
 No. 70 Squadron RAF
 No. 78 Squadron RAF
 No. 81 Squadron RAF
 No. 84 Squadron RAF
 No. 152 Squadron RAF
 No. 207 Squadron RAF
 No. 209 Squadron RAF
 No. 267 Squadron RAF
 Empire Test Pilots' School
 
 Zambian Air Force

Surviving aircraft

Belgium

 RM-4 – On static display at the Brussels Aviation Museum in Brussels.
 RM-7 – On static display with the Dakota Documentation Centre at Melsbroek Air Base in Steenokkerzeel, Flemish Brabant.

Germany
 54+02 – C.54 on static display at the Sinsheim Auto & Technik Museum in Sinsheim, Baden-Württemberg. It is painted as D-CAKE.
 54+07 – C.54 on static display at the Militärhistorisches Museum Flugplatz Berlin-Gatow in Gatow, Berlin.
 54+08 – C.54 on static display at the Aeronauticum in Nordholz, Lower Saxony.
 54+21 – C.54 on static display at the Flugausstellung Hermeskeil in Hermeskeil, Rhineland-Palatinate.
 54+24 – C.54 on static display at the Flugausstellung Hermeskeil in Hermeskeil, Rhineland-Palatinate.

Sweden
 83007 – Tp 83 on static display at the Svedino Automobile and Aviation Museum in Ugglarp, Halland.
 83008 – Tp 83 airworthy at the Västerås Flygmuseum in Västerås, Västmanland. It is registered as SE-BKH and previously served with the Royal Air Force as XK884.

United Kingdom
 WV740 – C.1 airworthy with Mark Anthony Stott in Exeter, Devon. It is registered as G-BNPH.
 WV746 – C.1 on static display at the Royal Air Force Museum Cosford in Cosford, Shropshire. It was formerly the personal aircraft of the Commander in Chief of the Air Support Command in the 1970s and was modified around that time to carry a wheelchair ramp. It later served with 60 Squadron in Germany in the 1980s.
 XL954 – C.1 airworthy with Air Atlantique in Coventry, West Midlands. It is registered as G-BXES. It was previously owned by the Classic Air Force.

United States

 XF796 – C.1 airworthy with Giuseppe Baldassarri in Carrollton, Georgia.
 RM-1 – Currently on Static display in Oshkosh Wisconsin.  It previously served with the Belgian Air Force.
RM-9-C.51 stored outside at Anoka-Blaine airport Slated to be dismantled and moved to Nashville Michigan / Round Engine Aero.
 C/N P66/0017
RM-2/OT-ZAB (BAF82), N51948 (Air America), N66PK, Puyallup/Thun Field, (WA USA), preserved near Taylor's Stateside Liquor Store, Neelyville, Missouri (MO, USA)
Unmarked on display at Stateline Liquor Store in Neelyville, Missouri. It displays nose art of a Tequila bottle and the name "Tequila Sunrise".

Specifications (Pembroke C.1)

See also

References

Notes

Bibliography
Bridgman, Leonard. Jane's All The World's Aircraft 1956–57. New York: McGraw-Hill Book Company, 1956. 
 The Illustrated Encyclopedia of Aircraft (Part Work 1982–1985) London: Orbis Publishing, 1985.
 Jackson, A.J. British Civil Aircraft since 1919 (Volume 3). London: Putnam, 1974. .
 Jefford, C.G. RAF Squadrons, a Comprehensive Record of the Movement and Equipment of all RAF Squadrons and their Antecedents since 1912. Shrewsbury, Shropshire, UK: Airlife Publishing, 2001. .
 Silvester, John. "Call to Arms: The Percival Sea Prince and Pembroke". Air Enthusiast, No. 55, Autumn 1994, pp. 56–61. 
 Sturtivant, Ray, ISO and John Hamlin. RAF Flying Training And Support Units since 1912. Tonbridge, Kent, UK: Air-Britain (Historians) Ltd., 2007. .

External links

RAF museum
Contemporary advert for Pembroke
 "Flight"  1954 cutaway drawing military mission roles

Pembroke
1950s British military transport aircraft
High-wing aircraft
Aircraft first flown in 1952
Twin piston-engined tractor aircraft